Alexis Guillermo Ochoa Gómez (born 13 July 1992 in Toluca) is a Mexican professional footballer who currently plays for Industriales Naucalpan.

References

External links
 

1992 births
Living people
Association football forwards
Deportivo Toluca F.C. players
Potros UAEM footballers
Liga MX players
Ascenso MX players
People from Toluca
Footballers from the State of Mexico
Mexican footballers